Jim, Jamie, Jimmy, Jimmie or James Vance may refer to:

Sportsmen
James Vance (footballer) (1877—after 1897), Scottish inside left
Jamie Vance (born 1997), American tennis player

Writers
James E. Vance, Jr. (1925–1999), American geographer
James Vance (comics) (1953–2017), American author and playwright
James David Vance (born 1984), American author and venture capitalist, a/k/a J.D. Vance

Others
James "Jim" Vance, American instigator of 1863–1891 Hatfield–McCoy feud
Jimmy Vance, Canadian World War I Air Force Cross recipient alongside Harry Yates
Jim Vance (1942–2017), American television news anchor
James Vance (1965–1985), American whose suicide instigated 1990 Judas Priest subliminal message trial

Characters
Jimmie Vance, male ingenue lead in D. W. Griffith's 1916 film Hoodoo Ann